Yelicones delicatus is a species of braconid wasp in the family Braconidae.

References

Further reading

External links

 

Parasitic wasps
Insects described in 1872